The Whitbourn River is a river of the Otago region of New Zealand's South Island. It is an upper tributary of the Dart River / Te Awa Whakatipu. The Whitbourn's entire length is within Mount Aspiring National Park.

See also
List of rivers of New Zealand

References

Rivers of Otago
Mount Aspiring National Park
Rivers of New Zealand